16 Cephei is a single star located about 119 light years away from the Sun in the constellation of Cepheus. It is visible to the naked eye as a faint, yellow-white hued star with an apparent visual magnitude of 5.036. The star has a relatively high proper motion, traversing the celestial sphere at the rate of 0.174 arc seconds per annum. It is moving closer to the Earth with a heliocentric radial velocity of −21 km/s.

This is an ordinary F-type main-sequence star, somewhat hotter than the sun, with a stellar classification of F5 V. It is around two billion years old with a projected rotational velocity of 26.4 km/s. The star has 1.38 times the mass of the Sun and 2.77 times the Sun's radius. It is radiating 11 times the luminosity of the Sun from its photosphere at an effective temperature of 6,238 K. The star is a source of X-ray emission.

There are several 11th and 12th magnitude stars within a few arc-minutes of 16 Cephei, all of them distant background objects. Only one of these is listed in the Washington Double Star Catalog and Catalog of Components of Double and Multiple Stars as a companion.

References

F-type main-sequence stars
Double stars
Cepheus (constellation)
Durchmusterung objects
Cephei, 16
108535
209369
8400